Burrsville is a populated place in Caroline County, Maryland, United States. One of the first references is on the 1875 Map of Caroline County, where the Burrsville Post Office appears. Burrsville is located near the Delaware border.

References

Unincorporated communities in Caroline County, Maryland
Unincorporated communities in Maryland